Dunston Common is a   Local Nature Reserve south of Norwich in Norfolk. It is owned and managed by South Norfolk District Council.

Most of this site is grassland with flora including lady's bedstraw, harebell and sheep's sorrel. There is also an area of semi-mature woodland at the western end.

There is access from Stoke Lane.

References

Local Nature Reserves in Norfolk